Metropolis is the first studio album by the indie rock band Swords. It was released in 2005 on Arena Rock Recording Co. The album is the third release from the group, originally named The Swords Project.

Track listing
 "The Product of Harm"  – 5:18
 "The Mark"  – 4:10
 "Savage Republic"  – 4:20
 "Family Photographs"  – 4:54
 "untitled"  – 2:10
 "Land Speed Record"  – 6:11
 "Radio, Radio"  – 3:33
 "Greyovernight"  – 4:46
 "Metropolis"  – 6:07
 "The Last Song"  – 5:25

External links
Arena Rock Recording Co.

Swords (band) albums
2005 albums
Arena Rock Recording Company albums